Jet CD is a studio album by Japanese pop rock duo Puffy, released on March 31, 1998 through Epic/Sony Records. It features five hit singles that they released between 1996 and 1997, including three of which topped the Japanese Oricon charts.

Jet debuted at the number-two on the Oricon Weekly Albums Charts (defeated by Globe's third album Love Again), and climbed the summit in following week. The album remained there for 16 weeks, becoming their only album to have sold more than 1 million copies. In March 1999, the album won the 13th Gold Disc Awards by the Recording Industry Association of Japan, the prizes conferred on the music recordings which gained outstanding commercial success.

In Japan, the album was simultaneously released on MD (entitled Jet-MD). In some Asian territories, it was also released on audio cassette under the alternative title Jet-Cassette.

The Japanese edition of Rolling Stone ranked Jet-CD as number 76 on their list of "100 Greatest Japanese Rock Albums".

Track listing

Chart positions

Certification

Accolades

Awards

References 

Puffy AmiYumi albums
1998 albums